is a Japanese manga artist who created a two-volume adaptation of the Japanese animated OVA series FLCL, and the original manga Q·Ko-chan: The Earth Invader Girl. He started his career as a dōjinshi artist, gaining a reputation for his quirky and unique style of art. He also does some costume design and sculpting. Ueda is also an artist known for his works with studio Shaft, particularly the Monogatari series in which he's acted as an opening and ending animator for various installments of the franchise.

Works

Manga
 FLCL (serialized in Kodansha's Monthly Magazine Z, 2000, 2 volumes)
 Q-Ko-Chan: The Earth Invader Girl (serialized in Kodansha's Monthly Magazine Z, 2004, 2 volumes)
 Jagdtiger by Kouhei Kadono – Illustrator (published in Del Rey's Faust, Vol. 2)

Anime
 Diebuster (2004) – Design Cooperation
 Uta Kata (2004) – Ending Illustration (ep 3)
 Bakemonogatari (2009) – Ending Animation, Back Sponsor Screen Illustration (ep 12)
 Natsu no Arashi! Akinai-chuu (2009) – End Card Illustration (ep 10)
 Puella Magi Madoka Magica (2011) – End Card Illustration (ep 6)
 Nisemonogatari (2012) – Ending Animation, Illustrations (ep 6), Key Animation (ep 10)
 Nekomonogatari (2012) – Ending Animation, Illustrations
 Monogatari Series Second Season (2013) – Ending Animation
 Nisekoi (2014) – End card illustration (ep 2)
 Hanamonogatari (2014) – Opening Animation, Illustrations
 Tsukimonogatari (2014) – Ending Animation, Illustrations
 I Can Friday By Day (2015) – 17th anime short for Japan Animator Expo
 Kizumonogatari I: Tekketsu-hen (2016) – Key Animation
 Kizumonogatari III: Reiketsu-hen (2017) – Illustrations
 The Dragon Dentist (TV Special) (2017) – Concept Design
 March Comes in Like a Lion 2nd Season (2017) – End Card Illustration (ep 30)
 Darling in the Franxx (2018) – Concept Design Cooperation
 Fate/Extra Last Encore Key Animation (ep 9)
 Zoku Owarimonogatari (2018) – Opening Animation, Ending Animation
 Magia Record (2020) – End Card (ep 5)
 RWBY: Ice Queendom (2020) – End Card (ep 4)

References

External links
 List of Hajime Ueda's works 
 

Living people
Manga artists
Year of birth missing (living people)